"Canção do exílio" (Exile song) is a poem written by the Brazilian Romantic author Gonçalves Dias in 1843, when he was in Portugal studying Law at the University of Coimbra. The poem is a famous example of the first phase of Brazilian Romanticism, which was characterized by strong nationalism and patriotism.

The poem first appeared in Dias' book Primeiros Cantos (First Chants), published in 1846. It was influenced by and loosely based on Johann Wolfgang von Goethe's ballad Mignon, and some verses of the ballad are used as the poem's epigraph.

"Canção do exílio" is one of the most famous poems of Brazilian literature, being referenced and/or parodied by many other Brazilian authors. The lines "Nossos bosques têm mais vida,/Nossa vida mais amores" are even used in the national anthem of Brazil.

The poem
The poem begins with an excerpt of Johann Wolfgang von Goethe's ballad Mignon as epigraph:

"Kennst du das Land, wo die Zitronen blühen,
Im dunkeln Laub die Gold-Orangen glühen,
Kennst du es wohl? – Dahin, dahin!
Möcht' ich... ziehn."

Freely translated into English as:

"Do you know the land where the lemon trees bloom,
And the golden oranges glitter in the dark foliage,
Do you know it? – There, there!
I would like to... go."

Well-known parodies, references and citations
The following is a list of the most famous parodies, reimaginings and citations of the poem, by other Brazilian authors.

 "Eu nasci além dos mares" and "Se eu tenho de morrer na flor dos anos" — Casimiro de Abreu
 "Canto de regresso à pátria" — Oswald de Andrade
 "Europa, França e Bahia" — Carlos Drummond de Andrade
 "Nova canção do exílio" — Carlos Drummond de Andrade
 "Canção do exílio" — Murilo Mendes
 "Canção do expedicionário" — Guilherme de Almeida
 "Uma canção" — Mário Quintana
 "Jogos florais I" and "II" — Cacaso
 "Canção do exílio facilitada — José Paulo Paes
 "Lisboa: Aventuras" — José Paulo Paes
 "Sabiá" — song by Chico Buarque and Tom Jobim
 "Terra das Palmeiras" — Taiguara
 "Terra minha" — Vinicius de Moraes
 "Marginália II" — Gilberto Gil
 "Canção do Exílio às Avessas" - Jô Soares

Brazilian poems
1843 poems